The president of Cameroon is the executive head of state and de facto head of government of Cameroon and is the commander in chief of the Cameroon Armed Forces. The authority of the State is exercised both by the President and by the Parliament.

History
The office of president of Cameroon was established in 1960, following the country's independence from France. The office was held by Ahmadou Ahidjo from 5 May 1960 to 6 November 1982 and then by Paul Biya since 6 November 1982.

Latest election

See also
Politics of Cameroon
Vice President of Cameroon

References

External links
 Official Website

 
Politics of Cameroon
1960 establishments in Cameroon